The 2013 Women's Masters Basel was held from October 11 to 13 the Curlingzentrum Region Basel in Basel, Switzerland as part of the 2013–14 World Curling Tour. The event was held in a triple-knockout format, and the purse for the event was CHF 32,000, of which the winner, Silvana Tirinzoni, received CHF 10,000. Tirinzoni, last year's runner-up, defeated Mirjam Ott in the final with a score of 7–5.

Teams
The teams are listed as follows:

Knockout results
The draw is listed as follows:

A event

B event

C event

Playoffs

References

External links

2013 in curling